"The Smelly Car" is the 61st episode of the sitcom Seinfeld. The episode is the 20th episode of the fourth season. It aired on April 15, 1993 on NBC. In this episode, the body odor left by a restaurant valet in Jerry's car further transfers itself to Jerry and Elaine, and seems to be irremovable. Meanwhile, George learns that his ex-girlfriend Susan has converted to lesbianism, and Kramer successfully seduces Susan's girlfriend.

Plot
After dinner, Jerry and Elaine discover a strong smell of body odor in Jerry's car, assumed to have been left by the valet who parked it. After they endure an unpleasant drive to the home of Elaine's boyfriend Carl, Carl is offended by the smell of Elaine's hair when they embrace. He tells her he has to get up early, so she does not spend the night.

George and Kramer return a video; at the video store, he admires two women who are holding hands. George is astounded when he sees one is his ex-girlfriend, Susan, who tells George she converted to lesbianism shortly after they broke up. Kramer practices his golf swing with a broom in front of Susan's girlfriend, Mona, a golf instructor. She is amused by him. The clerk tells George that he has to pay a $2 fee because he did not rewind the tape. Kramer suggests it would be cheaper to keep the video, rewind it himself, and return it the next day.

Kramer comments that Jerry and Elaine have absorbed the body odor from the car. Elaine realizes the odor is the reason Carl did not spend the night with her. Jerry returns to the restaurant demanding that they share the cost of cleaning the car. When the restaurant maître d' refuses, Jerry locks him inside the car, not letting him out until he agrees to pay half of the $250 fee. George discovers someone stole the video out of the car while he and Jerry were inside the restaurant.

Mona is attracted to Kramer, which Jerry, Elaine and George cannot understand as she has never been with a man before. This angers Susan, due to her dislike of Kramer, as well as George, who worries that he drove Susan to lesbianism. Feeling more attracted to her after finding this out, George attempts to woo Susan, and appears to be making progress. However, the two are approached by George's ex, Allison (from the episode "The Outing"), who instantly establishes a mutual attraction with Susan.

After a complete "de-ionizing" of the car, Jerry discovers the stink is still there. Elaine goes to a hair salon to wash the smell out of her hair, but Carl tells her she still smells. She finally resorts to dousing her hair in tomato sauce. Jerry tries to sell the car, but the dealer claims he cannot sell it. Kramer's relationship with Mona ends when she smells the odor on him - he had borrowed Jerry's jacket, which he wore in the car. Jerry tries abandoning the car, deliberately dropping the keys in plain view of a street hoodlum. The hoodlum takes the keys and hops into the car, but is disgusted by the smell.

Production
Co-writer Peter Mehlman got the idea for the episode from the real-life experiences of a friend of his. According to Mehlman, the friend would frequently pitch him ideas for episodes, none of which were even close to being good enough to use, but on this occasion the friend was simply complaining about the ordeal, at which point Mehlman immediately decided that it would be perfect for the show.

Amy McWilliams remarks that this is an example of many episodes that are "open-ended": it lacks "a traditional resolution completely, as when the viewer is simply left with a final comic shot of a street hoodlum wrinkling his nose as he tries to steal 'The Smelly Car'."

Critical response

Variety's contemporary review praised Larry David and Peter Mehlman's "witty script", highlighting George's storyline as taking numerous turns and "being filled with amusing detail."

Linda S. Ghent, Professor in the Department of Economics at Eastern Illinois University, discusses this episode in view of its economic themes, specifically those of externality, the Coase theorem, and moral hazard. Ghent explains,

References

External links 
 

Seinfeld (season 4) episodes
1993 American television episodes
American LGBT-related television episodes
Television episodes written by Larry David